The 1894 Yale Bulldogs football team was an American football team that represented Yale University as an independent during the 1894 college football season. The team finished with a 16–0 record, shut out 13 of 16 opponents, and outscored all opponents by a total of 485 to 13. William Rhodes was the head coach, and Frank Hinkey was the team captain.

There was no contemporaneous system in 1894 for determining a national champion. However, Yale was retroactively named as the national champion by the Billingsley Report, Helms Athletic Foundation, and National Championship Foundation, and as a co-national champion by Parke H. Davis.

Five Yale players were selected as consensus first-team players on the 1894 All-America team. The team's consensus All-Americans were: quarterback George Adee, fullback Frank Butterworth, end Frank Hinkey, center Phillip Stillman, and guard Bill Hickok.

The Bulldogs' 16–0 record was not matched again at any level of college football until 125 years later when the 2019 North Dakota State Bison football team won the 2019 FCS national championship.

Schedule

References

Yale
Yale Bulldogs football seasons
College football national champions
College football undefeated seasons
Yale Bulldogs football